Toketee State Airport  is a public airport located two miles (3.2 km) south of Clearwater in Douglas County, Oregon, United States. It is closed between November 1 and May 1, and pilots are advised that elk and deer can sometimes be found on the runway.

External links
FAA Form 5010 for Toketee State Airport

Airports in Douglas County, Oregon